Plessisville is a parish municipality in the Centre-du-Québec region of Quebec. It completely surrounds the city of the same name.

Demographics 

References

Parish municipalities in Quebec
Incorporated places in Centre-du-Québec